David Hutchinson (born 28 May 1988) is a British theatre producer and director. and is founder and CEO of Selladoor Worldwide, formerly Sell a Door Theatre Company Hutchinson attended the Liverpool Institute for Performing Arts 2006 to 2009 and graduated with a  BA (Hons) in Acting.

David Hutchinson created Sell A Door Theatre Company in 2009 after graduating from Liverpool Institute of Performing Arts. Whilst the company began touring to small scale venues and producing for fringe festivals, within less than 10 years David Hutchinson was producing UK Tours at mid and large scale venues, International Tours across 4 continents and West End productions. David Hutchinson is now the CEO of Selladoor Worldwide and his portfolio of productions includes 9 to5 The Musical (Savoy Theatre, London), Falsettos (The Other Palace, London), Flashdance The Musical (UK & International tours), Madagascar The Musical (UK & International tours), Jersey Boys (International Tour), The Producers (International Tour), Avenue Q (UK Tours), Amelie The Musical (UK Tour & The Other Palace), Of Mice And Men (UK Tour), Elmer The Patchwork Elephant Show (UK & International Tours). A full list Selladoor’s productions are detailed in the Credits section.

In addition to producing musicals, plays and family shows, David Hutchinson expanded the company in 2019 launching Selladoor Venues, becoming the theatre operator for Queen’s Theatre Barnstaple, The Landmark Ilfracombe, New Theatre Peterborough.

In 2020 David Hutchinson announced the launch of a brand new company dedicate to developing and staging large-scale experiential and live gameplay productions, Gamepath. Gamepath launches in partnership with leading global entertainment brands, alongside the announcement of Monopoly Lifesized, in collaboration with HASBRO, as well as other major iconic titles across the gaming and cinematic genres in creation.

David is also the co-founder of We Are I Am, alongside Louis Hartshorn, a marketing company that provides specialist marketing, press and communications support to the arts sector.

David is a notable campaigner for strengthening international relations in response to the challenges that Brexit brings to the theatre industry, and advocated for support from the Government to support the Arts during the Covid-19 pandemic.

David sits on the board of the New Wolsey Theatre, Ipswich since 2016 and is associate director of the Brooklyn Youth Company in New York City.

Theatrical career

In 2010 he directed the UK tour of Dracula at twelve venues across Scotland, and in 2012 directed a co-production between Sell a Door Theatre Company and Mull Theatre of Arthur Miller's The Man Who Had All the Luck which toured across Scotland and London.

Hutchinson  produced the debut UK Tour of Spring Awakening the Musical touring to the Exeter Northcott Theatre, Manchester The Lowry, Stirling MacRobert Arts Centre, Greenwich Theatre and Norwich Playhouse. He produced the debut West End production of Seussical at the Arts Theatre, London in December 2012. He went on to produce the 2014 tour of Avenue Q touring 32 venues in the UK, Ireland and Hong Kong

David first produced the Scotsman Fringe First award winning play Rainbow at the Edinburgh Fringe Festival in 2012.

In 2013, David Hutchinson partnered Sell a Door Theatre Company with the Greenwich Theatre following nine productions at the South London venue. James Haddrell and David officially announced the partnership on 19 November ahead of Sell a Door Theatre Company opening their second West End production of Seussical.

In 2014, as Sell A Door Theatre Company, David produced their first UK Tour of the popular musical Avenue Q. Due to the demand and success from their production it completed another UK Tour throughout 2015 and 2016.

In 2015, David Hutchinson directed the world premiere of Jo Clifford's Jekyll and Hyde based on Robert Louis Stevenson's gothic classic at the Greenwich Theatre followed by a thirty-three venue tour across the UK.

In 2016 David Hutchinson continued to expand the company in size, borders and targets, rebranding the company to Selladoor Worldwide.  Sell A Door Theatre Company had established themselves as an integral part of the regional theatre landscape in the UK and Ireland, but Hutchinson aspired to expand further afield and therefore to produce and tour theatre not only in the UK, but worldwide.

Along with UK Tours of Footloose, Flashdance The Musical, Spamalot, and The Crucible, David Hutchinson, as Selladoor Worldwide produced their first International Tours in 2017, including Jersey Boys and The Producers. Collectively in 2017 Selladoor Worldwide’s productions performed in 8 different countries.

2018 began with the opening of the UK tour of Of Mice And Men in association with the Marlowe Theatre in Canterbury. The second play produced in 2018 was Diane Samuel’s Kindertransport in collaboration with the Queen’s Theatre Hornchurch and Les Theatre De La Villa De Luxembourg. Flashdance The Musical continued to tour the UK throughout 2018 as well visiting international venues such as Zurich MAAG and Kursaal Oostende. Notably, in the summer of 2018 Selladoor launched two new productions, Madagascar The Musical and Fame the 30th Anniversary UK tour, as well as co-producing the musical, Rock of Ages with DLAP. During the Christmas season Selladoor produced The Wizard of Oz christmas show in Blackpool and Aladdin pantomime at The Broadway Theatre, Catford.

In 2018, David Hutchinson launched Selladoor Creation, a platform for new writers to showcase and develop their work and bring innovative new work to the national and international stage, making it accessible for all audiences.

In 2019 American Idiot was revived for a 10th Anniversary Tour, and Avenue Q embarked on its 3rd UK Tour. David Hutchinson co-produced 9 to 5 the musical with ATG and Dolly Parton at the Savoy Theatre, London. David Hutchinson as Selladoor Worldwide also produced the London premiere of Falsettos at The Other Palace, alongside UK tours of Amelie The Musical and Little Miss Sunshine the Musical, Elmer The Patchwork Elephant Show and The Mr. Men & Little Miss On Stage. In 2019 David Hutchinson became a theatre operator, launching Selladoor Venues, which includes the Queen’s Theatre, Barnstaple; The Landmark Theatre, Ilfracombe; and Peterborough New Theatre

In 2020 Selladoor announced the UK tours of Footloose The Musical and Bring It On the Musical and international tours of We Will Rock You and 9 to 5 the Musical, however due to Covid-19 all productions have been postponed to 2021.

International expansion
David travels internationally regularly to explore new performance opportunities and business ventures, annually attending conferences such as SPAF (China) and APAP (New York). This has enabled numerous Selladoor productions to perform outside of the UK, to territories such as Switzerland, Germany, Belgium, Turkey, China, Malaysia, New Zealand, UAE.

The level of international touring significantly increased for Selladoor Worldwide, with a particular focus in Asia. Therefore, in 2017 David Hutchinson opened an international office in Bangkok, as Selladoor Asia Pacific, which is managed by Peevara Kitchumnongpan.

Continuing to open doors to the world to help make theatre accessible across the globe, David opened the Selladoor Spain office in Madrid in 2019, with Juan Carlos Orihuela, opening with the transfer of Flashdance The Musical at the Apollo Theatre, Madrid. David saw the opportunity of having a mainland European hub, especially in light of Brexit, to enable Selladoor to continue to maintain strong ties with the continent.

Notable events
2009 – Sell A Door Theatre Company was created 
2011 - Associate Director of the Brooklyn Youth Company in New York City 
2013 – Partnership  with Greenwich Theatre
2016 – Selladoor Worldwide was established 
2016 – Launched Greenwich Young Writers Group 
2016 – Co-founded We Are I AM (previously I AM Marketing) 
2017 – Produced first International Tours – Jersey Boys & The Producers 
2017 – First production to open in North America
2018 – Asia Pacific office opened 
2018 – Nominated for the Tourism and Culture Awards at Greenwich Business Awards 
2019 - Launch of Selladoor Venues, including Queen's Theatre Barnstaple, The Landmark Ilfracombe, Peterborough New Theatre 
2019 - Madrid office opened with the productiong of Flashdance The Musical 
2020 - Awarded The Stage's International Award 
2020 - Launch of Gamepath, a new company dedicated to experimental & live gameplay

Commissions
A Foreign Field –  In development
An adaptation of Ben Macintyre’s Novel ‘A Foreign Field’ – An extraordinary story of love, duplicity and shame. Book written by Ludovic-Alexandre Vidal and Music written by Julien Salvia

Guess How Much I Love You – 2017/18
By Sam McBratney, Adapted by Anna Fox 
In early 2017 it performed at Greenwich Theatre and Portsmouth King’s Theatre before touring to the Middle East in Spring. Culminating with an extended run at the Arts Theatre in London at the end of 2017. In 2018 Guess How Much I Love You goes on to enjoy a Far East tour along with a larger tour of the UK.

The Quite Remarkable Adventures of the Owl and the Pussycat - 2017
Adapted from the Eric Idle book, by Dougal Irvine
Coventry, Belgrade Theatre  

The Broons  - 2016
Adapted by Rob Drummond (The Broons)
10 venue Scottish Tour, venues included Edinburgh Kings, Glasgow Theatre Royal, and Aberdeen His Majesty’s Theatre  

The Silver Sword –  2015 
By Ian Serraillier, Adapted by Susie McKenna and Steven Edis
8 venue UK Tour  

Jekyll and Hyde  - 2015
By Robert Louis Stevenson, Adapted by Jo Clifford
31 venue UK Tour  

Alice in Wonderland  - 2014
By Lewis Carroll, Adapted by the company
Greenwich Theatre  

Kidnapped  - 2014
By Robert Louis Stevenson, Adapted by Ivan Wilkinson
36 venue tour, including Greenwich Theatre and opened at Sell A Door Theatre's Scottish home, The Beacon Arts Centre in Greenock.

Sincerely Mr Toad, based on the life of Kenneth Grahame - 2013
Book by David Hutchinson, Lyrics by Katy McIvor and Music and Lyrics by David Wilson
5 venue UK tour, including performances at Greenwich Theatre and Edinburgh Festival  

Six Ways, a New Musical - 2012
Book by David Hutchinson, Lyrics by Paddy Clarke and Music by Michael Bradley

Credits

Producer - Sell a Door Theatre Company
2021 Bring It On The Musical, Book by Jeff Whitty, Music by Tom Kitt & Lin-Manuel Miranda, Lyrics by Amanda Green & Lin-Manuel Miranda
2021 We Will Rock You, Book by Ben Elton, Music & Lyrics by Queen
2021 Footloose The Musical, by Dean Pitchford
2020 Oor Wullie, by Noisemaker
2019 9 to 5 The Musical, Book by Patricia Resnick, Music & Lyrics by Dolly Parton
2019 Frankenstein, Adapted by Rona Munro
2019 Mr. Men & Little Miss On Stage, Composed by Harry Sever
2019 Falsettos, Booky by James Lapine, Music & Lyrics by William Finn
2019 Elmer The Patchwork Elephant Show, Based on the children’s book series by David McKee, Adapted by Suzanne Miller, Songs written by Allison Leyton-Brown
2019 Rock of Ages The Musical, by Chris D'Arienzo
2019 Amelie The Musical, Book by Craig Lucas, Music by Daniel Messe, Lyrics by Nathan Tysen & Daniel Messe
2019 Little Miss Sunshine The Musical, Book by James Lapine, Music & Lyrics by William Finn
2019 Avenue Q, Conceived by Robert Lopez and Jeff Marx
2019 American Idiot, by Green Day, Billie Joe Armstrong and Michael Mayer
2018 Fame, Book by Jose Fernandez, Lyrics byJacques Levy, Composer: Steve Margoshes
2018 Madagascar A Musical Adventure, Book by Kevin Del Aguila, Music and Lyrics buGeorge Noriega & Joel Someillan
2018 Kindertransport, by Diane Samuels
2018 Of Mice And Men, by John Steinbeck
2017 Peter Pan A Musical Adventure, by J.M Barrie, adapted by Robert Marsden
2017 Big Fish, Book by John August, Music & Lyrics by Andrew Lippa
2017 The Producers, by Mel Brooks
2017 Jersey Boys, Book by Marshall Brickman & Rick Elice, Lyrics by Bob Crewe
2017 The Very Hungry Caterpillar, Based on the books by Eric Carle
2017 Spamalot, by Eric Idle
2017 Flashdance The Musical, Book by Tom Hedley & Robert Cary, Composed by Robbie Roth
2017 Footloose The Musical, by Dean Pitchford
2017 Guess How Much I Love You, based on the book by Sam McBratney
2017 The Quite Remarkable Adventures of the Owl and the Pussycat, Book by Eric Idle, adapted by Dougal Irvine
2017 The Crucible, by Arthur Miller
2016 The Broons, by DC Thompson, adapted by Rob Drummond
2016 Little Shop of Horrors, Book by Howard Ashamn, Composed by Alan Menken
2016 Footloose The Musical, by Dean Pitchford
2016 American Idiot, by Billie Joe Armstrong
2016 Hand to God, by Robert Askins
2016 Avenue Q, conceived by Robert Lopez
2016 James and the Giant Peach, by Roald Dahl
2016 Meantime, Greenwich Young Writers Programme (2016)
2015 Silver Sword, By Ian Serraillier, Adapted by Susie McKenna and Steven Edis
2015 Seussical, Book & Lyrics by Lynn Ahrens, Composed by Stephen Flaherty
2015 "Jekyll and Hyde" adapted by Jo Clifford
2015 "The History Boys" by Alan Bennett
2014 Sunset Song adapted by Alastair Cording
2014 Avenue Q conceived by Robert Lopez and Jeff Marx
2014 Kidnapped adapted by Ivan Wilkinson
2013 Seussical by Lynn Ahrens and Stephen Flaherty
2013 Ghosts adapted by Alfred Enoch
2013 Sincerely, Mr Toad by David Hutchinson, David Andrew Wilson and Katie McIvor
2013 1984 adapted by Matthew Dunster
2013 A Midsummer Nights Dream by William Shakespeare
2013 Journey's End by R.C Sherriff
2012 Seussical by Lynn Ahrens and Stephen Flaherty
2012 Rainbow by Emily Jenkins
2012 Sealand by Luke Clarke
2012 Peter by Stacy Sobieski
2012 The Man Who Had All the Luck by Arthur Miller
2012 The Hound of the Baskervilles adapted by Tim Kelly
2012 The History Boys by Alan Bennett
2011 A Christmas Carol Adapted by David Hutchinson & Anna Schneider
2011 Lord of the Flies Adapted by Nigel Williams
2011 Spring Awakening by Steven Sater and Duncan Sheik
2011 Proof by David Auburn
2011 A Taste of Honey by Shelagh Delaney
2011 The Comedy of Errors by William Shakespeare
2010 Dracula by Liz Lochhead
2010 Ms Minelli and the Daring Do by Sam Thackray
2010 The Railway Children by Dave Simpson
2010 Stitching by Anthony Neilson
2010 The House of Mirrors and Hearts by Eamonn O'Dwyer and Robert Gilbert
2010 Next Thing You Know by Joshua Salzman and Ryan Cunningham
2010 Scaredy Cat Prince by David Hutchinson
2010 The Philanderer by George Bernard Shaw
2010 Where the Solitary Eagle Flies by David Hutchinson
2010 Twelfth Night by William Shakespeare
2009 Blue/Orange by Joe Penhall
2009 Six Ways by David Hutchinson, Paddy Clarke and Michael Bradley
2009 Falsettoland by William Finn and James Lapine
2009 By Order of Ignorance by Robert Gilbert
2009 Planning Permission by David Hutchinson
2009 The Jason Robert Brown Song Cycle created by Michael Bradley
2008 The Ugly One by Marius von Mayenburg
2008 The Night Before Christmas by Anthony Neilson
2008 The Sugar Syndrome by Lucy Prebble
2008 So Much to Say for Myself by Robert Gilbert
2008 Heart and Music by David Hutchinson
2008 Treats by Christopher Hampton
2008 The Secrets Inside by David Hutchinson
2007 Two by Jim Cartwright

References

1988 births
Living people
British theatre managers and producers
British theatre directors
Alumni of the Liverpool Institute for Performing Arts